Gerald Malke (5 December 1963 – 1 September 2016), known professionally as Gary D, was a German trance/hardstyle producer and DJ, known for the trance compilations D.Trance.

Career

Early career
Gary D. started out playing as a DJ at the age of 16 in 1980. In his first years, he mostly played Black Music. It wasn't until 1988 when Gary D. started to get more involved with electronic such as, Techno and House, which in the same year he released his first single "Ecstasy" under alias "Acid Syndrome". As a DJ, Gary D. performed often at a club in Hamburg called 'Unit Club' from 1988 up until its closure in 1994. He later moved to another club called 'Tunnel'.

As a trance producer and DJ
In 1991, Gary D. released his first trance EP, "Identity E.P." with five singles on it, which was released on Container Records, the label on which he released many singles before switching to Tunnel & Bonzai Records. Under Bonzai, Gary released the two Hard Trance singles "Kinetic Pressure" and "Overload".

In late 1995, he and two others from PIAS Recordings Germany came up with an idea to create a trance compilation, which came out to be "D.Trance", which grew into a big success. Gary D. released more than 40 D.Trance compilations as of 2009. Gary added a third disc, which compiled all the tracks from the first discs into one mix. From 1996 to 2016, he also released five solo albums. In 2000, he created "D. Techno" a harder style compilation.

Shift to hardstyle
In 2001, Gary took a different direction with his career, and started to release more techno, and adopted hardstyle kind of music to his DJ sets. From 2003-2005 he played in many gigs in the Netherlands and played in large venues with up to 25,000 people.

Death
He died from pulmonary embolism.

Discography

Albums
WORKS, 1995, CONTAINER RECORDS, GARY D. PROJECT SAMPLER
BANG!, 1997, DJ`S PRESENT
D.SIGNALS, 1999, DJ`S PRESENT
STRIKE!!!, 2001, DJ`S PRESENT
FOUR, 2004, EDM

12" singles
IDENTITTY E.P., 1991, CONTAINER RECORDS
93 E.P., 1993, CONTAINER RECORDS
OH JA BITTE, 1993, CONTAINER RECORDS
SLAMMIN`, 1994, CONTAINER RECORDS
SLAMMIN`(REMIXES), 1994, CONTAINER RECORDS
ANAL INTRUDER E.P., 1994, RADIKAL RECORDS – US RELEASE
LOVE IS AN OCEAN, 1995, CONTAINER RECORDS PROMO ONLY RELEASE
ANAL INTRUDER, 1995, EVOLVER RECORDS
ICE MACHINE HEAD, 1995, EVOLVER RECORDS
KINETIC PRESSURE, 1996, BONZAI RECORDS, BELGIUM
TIMEWARP, 1996, BONZAI RECORDS, BELGIUM
D.TRANCE ANTHEM, 1996, DJ`S PRESENT
CAN`T DO WITHOUT IT, 1997, DJ`S PRESENT
TAKE CONTROL, 1997, DJ`S PRESENT
PARADISE E.P., 1997, BIT MUSIC, SPAIN
DONNERGOTT, 1999, DJ`S PRESENT
STEP FORWARD, 1999, DJ`S PRESENT
DIE HERDPLATTE 2000°, 2000, DJ`S PRESENT
SPRINGWORLD 2001, 2000, DJ`S PRESENT
MY HOUZZE, 2001, DJ`S PRESENT
ELEVATE YOUR MIND, 2002, DJ`S PRESENT
D.TRANCE ANTHEM 2002, 2002, DJ`S PRESENT
B.A.S.S. KICK DOWN, 2003, EDM
RAISE YOUR HANDS, 2004, EDM
FOUR IZ THE NUMBER, 2004, EDM
STUPID MUTHAFUCKAZ, 2006, DTRAXX RECORDINGS
GOOD SHIT, 2007, DTRAXX RECORDINGS
HARDSTYLEBASS, 2007, DTRAXX RECORDINGS
HIGHER STATE OF HAPPINESS, 2008, TUNNEL RECORDS

References

1963 births
2016 deaths
Deaths from pulmonary embolism
German electronic musicians
German trance musicians
German DJs
Club DJs